The San Juan Ecological Corridor (Spanish: Corredor Ecológico de San Juan, shortened to CESJ) is a project dedicated to the preservation of an ecological corridor in the municipality of San Juan, Puerto Rico, designated under Law No. 206 on August 28, 2003.

Overview 
The San Juan Ecological Corridor constitutes approximately 1,000 cuerdas (971 acres) of secondary forests, protected natural zones and green spaces within the municipality of San Juan, particularly throughout the barrios (districts) of El Cinco, Cupey, Río Piedras (Pueblo) and Sabana Llana Sur, and it includes the University of Puerto Rico Botanical Garden and Research Station. The geography consists of karst hills, highlands, valleys and plains with elevations ranging from 32 feet (10 m) to 377 feet (115 m) above sea level. This ecological corridor is important for the protection of the Piedras River hydrographic basin and the San Juan Estuary drainage ecosystems.

Constituents 
The following protected areas are included in the San Juan Ecological Corridor:

 Cupey Arboretum
 Doña Inés Mendoza Urban Forest
 Los Capuchinos Forest
 New Millennium State Forest
 Old Piedras River Aqueduct
 University of Puerto Rico Botanical Garden

See also 
 Protected areas of Puerto Rico

References 

Protected areas of Puerto Rico
Forests of Puerto Rico
Geography of San Juan, Puerto Rico
2003 establishments in Puerto Rico
Protected areas established in 2003
University of Puerto Rico
Ecological connectivity